The Jones Point Light is a small river lighthouse located on the Potomac River in Alexandria, Virginia.  It was built in 1855.  It is a small, one-story house with a lantern on top and served primarily as a warning light for naval ships approaching the Washington Navy Yard.  The lighthouse was discontinued in 1926, replaced by a small steel skeletal tower located nearby; this smaller tower was in use for ten years before being discontinued.  After being dark for more than half a century, Jones Point Light was relit by a private concern in 1995, however, it was eventually put out again after ownership switched from the Daughters of the American Revolution Foundation to the National Park Service. Certain local efforts have called for the structure to be relit, but as of 2017, the only working lighthouse on the Potomac River is the Fort Washington Point Lighthouse, located five miles downriver.

The lighthouse is located on Jones Point in Alexandria, and is part of Jones Point Park.  Visitors can approach the lighthouse, but it is currently impossible to enter the building.

The lighthouse is immediately north of the confluence of Hunting Creek and the Potomac River. The 1791-1792 survey of the boundaries of the District of Columbia began at a spot that was then at the tip of a cape at the Point.  The south cornerstone from the boundary survey remains in the seawall adjacent to the lighthouse.

In 1980, the lighthouse and the cornerstone were listed in the National Register of Historic Places as reference #80000352. The lighthouse is also listed in the Library of Congress Historic American Buildings Survey as survey number VA-641. The listing shows lighthouse drawings and several black-and-white photos of the lighthouse prior to restoration.

Gallery

References

External links 

NPS Inventory of Historic Light Stations
Lighthousefriends: Jones Point Lighthouse
Chesapeake Bay Lighthouse Project - Jones Point Light
Jones Point Lighthouse, Jones Point, Potomac River, Alexandria, Independent City, VA at the Historic American Buildings Survey (HABS)
America's Byways: Jones Point Lighthouse

Lighthouses completed in 1855
Buildings and structures in Alexandria, Virginia
Lighthouses on the National Register of Historic Places in Virginia
National Register of Historic Places in Alexandria, Virginia
Historic American Buildings Survey in Virginia
George Washington Memorial Parkway
National Park Service areas in Virginia